Liu Xiaosheng (born 5 January 1988 in Raoping, Guangdong) is a Chinese sprinter who specializes in the 400 metres.

He represented his country at the 2008 Summer Olympics.

His personal best time is 45.79 seconds, achieved in June 2007 in Suzhou.

References 
 
 Team China 2008

1988 births
Living people
Athletes (track and field) at the 2008 Summer Olympics
Chinese male sprinters
Olympic athletes of China
People from Chaozhou
Asian Games medalists in athletics (track and field)
Runners from Guangdong
Athletes (track and field) at the 2010 Asian Games
Asian Games bronze medalists for China
Medalists at the 2010 Asian Games